Richard William Hart Jarvis (November 30, 1829 – January 21, 1903) was an American businessman and industrialist from Connecticut.

Jarvis was the brother-in-law of Samuel Colt who took control of Colt's Manufacturing Company on the death of Elisha K. Root, serving as the company's longest president from 1865 to 1901. Jarvis served the company from the end of the American Civil War through the early 20th century seeing the transition from percussion revolvers to cartridge revolvers to semi-automatic pistols and machine guns.

He died on January 21, 1903, in Hartford, Connecticut and was interred at Cedar Hill Cemetery.

References

1829 births
1903 deaths
American industrialists
Burials at Cedar Hill Cemetery (Hartford, Connecticut)
Colt's Manufacturing Company
19th-century American businesspeople